Woodyard was an unincorporated community in Roane County, West Virginia. Its post office  is closed.

The community was named after William Woodyard, a state legislator.

References 

Unincorporated communities in West Virginia
Unincorporated communities in Roane County, West Virginia